Yury Konstantinovich Kirichenko (born 18 February 1991), is a Russian taekwondo athlete. In 2009, Kirichenko won gold at the World Junior Championships in Vigo. His best senior result to date was winning bronze at the 2017 Taekwondo Grand Prix Series in Moscow, bronze at the European Championship in Kazan 2018, gold at the World Team Championship 2018.

References

External links 
Profile on Taekwondodata

Living people
Russian male taekwondo practitioners
1991 births
People from Kamchatka Krai
European Taekwondo Championships medalists
21st-century Russian people
20th-century Russian people